Fusinus pulchellus is a species of sea snail, a marine gastropod mollusk in the family Fasciolariidae, the spindle snails, the tulip snails and their allies.

Description

Distribution

References

External links

pulchellus
Gastropods described in 1844
Taxa named by Rodolfo Amando Philippi